Echetlaeus (Ancient Greek: Ἐχετλαῖος) or Echetlus (Ἔχετλος) was an ancient Athenian mythical hero of the  Battle of Marathon with the Persians of the Achaemenid Empire. The latter name was also the name of a hero of ancient Thebes.

The hero of the Athenians
Echetlus emerged in the narrative tradition current in ancient Athens after the Battle of Marathon. His description was similar to Bouzyges, who is often depicted bearded, nude and holding a plough and a cattle prod. Some scholars note the close connection of these two with agriculture. Bouzyges was the hero considered the founder of agriculture and his name meant "yoker of oxen" while Echetlus' meant "he of the plough-handle".   

In the battle's account, a man, who resembled a rustic, appeared among the Athenians during the battle and slew many of the Persians with his plough. After the battle, he disappeared. When the Athenians searched for him, they could not find him anywhere. It was believed that he was part of the gods' intervention during the conflict, which also included the appearances of divine personages such as Athena and Herakles in the battlefield. 

This Echetlus was depicted in the painting which represented the Battle of Marathon in the Stoa Poikile (Painted Porch), erected during the 5th century BC and located in the Ancient Agora of Athens. The hero was clearly distinguishable in this painting among the combatants in the same manner other heroes who fought at Marathon such as Callimachus, the polemarch of Athens, and Miltiades were depicted. Echetlus' mythical status in the eyes of the Athenians can be demonstrated by his inclusion in this painting, which also included Athena, Heracles, and the Attic heroes such as Theseus. The Stoa Poikile was one of the most famous sites in ancient Athens, due to its display of war-related paintings and loot.

References

Source 

Battle of Marathon
Ancient Athenians